Sharon: Kasama Mo, Kapatid is a Philippine TV's daytime afternoon musical talk show that airs on TV5. It stars multi-media Megastar Sharon Cuneta. It is produced by Mega Productions, a subsidiary of Viva Television.

Host 
Sharon Cuneta

References

See also
List of programs aired by The 5 Network

2012 Philippine television series debuts
2013 Philippine television series endings
TV5 (Philippine TV network) original programming
Philippine television talk shows
Philippine musical television series
Television series by Viva Television
Filipino-language television shows